Seetraun is a river of Bavaria, Germany. At its confluence with the Fischbach south of Ruhpolding, the Weiße Traun is formed.

See also
List of rivers of Bavaria

References

Rivers of Bavaria
Rivers of Germany

de:Weiße Traun#Seetraun